Sonic Explorations is the debut album by American jazz pianist Matthew Shipp and alto saxophonist Rob Brown, originally issued on LP in 1988 on Cadence Jazz.

Both musicians played together for about 5 years before. "Sonic Explorations" is a suite in 6 sections (including a piano solo and a sax solo section). The duo also plays jazz standards Oleo by Sonny Rollins and Blue in Green (credited to Miles Davis on Kind of Blue, but Shipp believes that Bill Evans wrote the piece). "I love Bill Evans even though a lot of people don't connect my playing with him at all. I learned a lot from him about phrasing, harmonic possibilities of the piano", Shipp says. The 2000 CD reissue adds additional takes of both standards.

Reception

In his review for AllMusic, Thom Jurek states "This duet by Matthew Shipp and Rob Brown from the late '80s offers a slice-of-the-pie view of Shipp's rethinking his own approach to improvisation and ensemble playing." The Penguin Guide to Jazz says that "there's much detailed interplay between piano and saxophone, with Brown's beautiful tone and ripping phrasing pushing the pianist into an accompanying role at times."

Track listing
All compositions by Matthew Shipp except as indicated
 "Sonic Explorations Section 1" - 8:07
 "Sonic Explorations Section 2" - 4:10
 "Sonic Explorations Section 3" - 5:46
 "Sonic Explorations Section 4" - 4:08
 "Sonic Explorations Section 5" (Rob Brown) - 5:21
 "Sonic Explorations Section 6" - 9:44
 "Oleo" (Sonny Rollins) - 3:32
 "Blue in Green" (Miles Davis / Bill Evans) - 6:10
 "Oleo - take 2" (Sonny Rollins) - 3:37
 "Blue in Green - take 2" (Miles Davis / Bill Evans) - 4:10
8 & 9 does not appear on original LP

Personnel
Matthew Shipp - piano
Rob Brown - alto sax

References

1988 debut albums
Cadence Jazz Records albums
Matthew Shipp albums
Rob Brown (saxophonist) albums